Michelle Moultrie (born July 13, 1990) is an American, former professional softball outfielder. She played college softball at Florida, where she was named SEC Player of the Year in 2012. She has been a member of United States women's national softball team since 2011 and competed at the 2020 Summer Olympics and won a silver medal. Currently, Moultire plays in the Athletes Unlimited Softball league.

Career
Moultrie was a walk-on player at Florida, and went on to achieve two Second Team and a First Team All-SEC honors, including being named 2012 SEC Player of the Year. She was named a Third Team and First Team All-American in her final two years.

Team USA
Moultrie represented Team USA at the 2020 Summer Olympics. During the tournament, she had two hits and one RBI. During the gold medal game, she had one of her hits as the USA was defeated by Team Japan 2–0.

Statistics

References

External Links

1990 births
Living people
Sportspeople from Jacksonville, Florida
Florida Gators softball players
Softball players from Florida
Pan American Games medalists in softball
Pan American Games gold medalists for the United States
Softball players at the 2019 Pan American Games
Medalists at the 2019 Pan American Games
Softball players at the 2015 Pan American Games
Women's College World Series Most Outstanding Player Award winners
Olympic softball players of the United States
Softball players at the 2020 Summer Olympics
Medalists at the 2020 Summer Olympics
Olympic silver medalists for the United States in softball
Olympic medalists in softball
Competitors at the 2022 World Games
World Games gold medalists
World Games medalists in softball